Alexander V may refer to:

 Alexander V of Macedon (died 294 BCE)
 Antipope Alexander V (–1410)
 Alexander V of Imereti (–1752)